L'Étang-Salé (French for The Salty Pond) is a commune in the department and region of Réunion. It is bordered by the communes of Les Avirons and Saint-Louis. Within the commune is the Étang-Salé forest. There is also a beach with black sand in the commune that is a popular surfing spot.

Geography

Climate

L'Étang-Salé has a tropical savanna climate (Köppen climate classification Aw) closely bordering on a hot semi-arid climate (BSh).

Demography

Economy and tourism
 there is an industrial zone in L'Étang-Salé
 a popular surfing beach in L'Étang-Salé-les-Bains
 several hotels
 an 18-hole golf course
 Croc' Park - a crocodile park

Images

See also
Communes of the Réunion department
Le Gouffre

References

External links

Site of the CIVIS
Personal website of the L'Étang-Salé's town

Communes of Réunion
Surfing locations in Réunion